Angaria poppei is a species of sea snail, a marine gastropod mollusk in the family Angariidae.

Description

The shell can grow to be 28 mm to 65 mm in length.

Distribution
Angaria poppei can be found off of the Philippines, Indonesia, and Malaysia.

References

Angariidae
Gastropods described in 1999